Lorraine Grace Viscardi Murray is an American author and columnist.

Life
Murray was born in Yonkers, New York and grew up in Miami. She received her bachelor's degree in English from the University of Florida and was elected to Phi Beta Kappa. She received her doctorate in philosophy from the University of Florida.

A radical feminist and atheist for over 20 years, she returned to Catholicism in her forties, a conversion journey she wrote about in her book, Confessions of an Ex-Feminist. Her other books include  How Shall We Celebrate?, Why Me? Why Now?: Finding Hope When You Have Breast Cancer, and Grace Notes: Embracing the Joy of Christ in a Broken World. She has also written a biography of Southern writer Flannery O'Connor, "The Abbess of Andalusia: Flannery O'Connor's Spiritual Journey." She also wrote three cozy mystery novels featuring amateur detective Francesca Bibbo. These are Death in the Choir, Death of a Liturgist, and Death Dons a Mask. Her essays on Christian themes appear in the Atlanta Journal-Constitution, The Georgia Bulletin, and the National Catholic Register. She is the widow of Tolkien artist Jef Murray, who died in 2015.

She won the first place Catholic Press Association award for "Best regular column - family life" in 2014.

She won the second place Catholic Press Association award for "Best regular column – general commentary" in 2006.

Bibliography
Grace Notes: Embracing the Joy of Christ in a Broken World (2002). Resurrection Press. pp. 173. 
Why Me? Why Now?: Finding Hope When You Have Breast Cancer (2003). Ave Maria Press. pp. 128. 
"A Wedding Day Resurrection", Georgia Bulletin, November 16, 2006.
Confessions of an Ex-Feminist (2008). Ignatius Press. pp. 150. 
Death in the Choir (2009). Tumblar House. pp. 186. 
The Abbess of Andalusia: Flannery O'Connor's Spiritual Journey (2009). Saint Benedict Press. pp. 256. 
Death of a Liturgist (2010). Saint Benedict Press. pp. 224. 
Death Dons a Mask (2013). Tumblar House. pp. 312.

References

External links
 Lorraine V. Murray website
 The Georgia Bulletin: The Newspaper of the Roman Catholic Archdiocese of Atlanta.

1947 births
Living people
American mystery writers
American Roman Catholic religious writers
Converts to Roman Catholicism from atheism or agnosticism
American feminists
University of Florida alumni
American women novelists
Women mystery writers
20th-century American novelists
20th-century American women writers
American women non-fiction writers
20th-century American non-fiction writers
21st-century American women